is a private university in Fukaya, Saitama, Japan, renamed in 2019.

History
 is established in 2009. It only offers degrees in nursing.

External links
  

Educational institutions established in 2009
Private universities and colleges in Japan
Universities and colleges in Saitama Prefecture
Nursing schools in Japan
Fukaya, Saitama
2009 establishments in Japan